Alycia Moulton (born February 18, 1961) is a retired American tennis player.

Career
Moulton won the U.S. Junior Championships in 1979 and was runner-up at the Wimbledon Junior Championships in 1979. She was active on the professional tour from 1978 to 1988. Her powerful game brought her two singles titles in 1983 and five doubles titles. She reached a career-high ranking of 18 in singles in November 1984, and won the Ridgewood Open and the Virginia Slims of Newport, Rhode Island.

Moulton achieved immediate success on the WTA Tour after graduating from Stanford University, where as team captain and four-time All-American, she was an NCAA singles, doubles and team champion. She was selected to represent the United States in Wightman Cup, and played doubles with Chris Evert, defeating Great Britain in that competition.

Moulton served two terms on the board of directors of the Women's Tennis Association. She has been inducted into the Sacramento Hall of Fame, the Stanford University Hall of Fame and the Northern California Tennis Hall of Fame.

Moulton was born in Sacramento. Her father, Lee Moulton, is an inventor and engineer born in 1923. Her mother, Eleanor Moulton is a small business owner born in 1932. Alycia has one brother, Gregory Moulton, a computer scientist and founder of Avamar Technologies. After her tennis career, Moulton started a real estate development company. This led her to attend law school at the University of California at Davis. After graduating she was married briefly to George Artz, a computer scientist and lifelong friend. Moulton worked for Congressman and former California State Senator, Mike Thompson. She is a real estate attorney and now resides in Menlo Park, California.

WTA career finals

Singles: 5 (2 titles, 3 runner-ups)

Doubles: 10 (6 titles, 5 runner-ups)

Grand Slam singles performance timeline

References

External links
 
 

1961 births
Living people
American female tennis players
Grand Slam (tennis) champions in girls' singles
People from Menlo Park, California
Sportspeople from Sacramento, California
Stanford Cardinal women's tennis players
Tennis people from California
US Open (tennis) junior champions
University of California, Davis alumni
20th-century American women